Jack Lee Anson (August 3, 1924 – September 15, 1990) was an important leader in the American college interfraternity movement, and was known as "Mr. Fraternity."  Under Anson's leadership as executive director of the North American Interfraternity Conference, college fraternities and sororities gained an exemption from Title IX legislation to preserve the single-sex nature of the organizations.

Early life and education
A native of Huntington, Indiana, Anson graduated from high school there and worked briefly as a sports reporter for the Huntington Herald-Press.  He then served in the U.S. Army in the European Theater, fighting in the Battle of the Bulge and became the Army's youngest master sergeant following his actions in the battle.  He graduated from Colgate University in 1948 where he was a member of Phi Kappa Tau fraternity.

Career
He spent his entire career in the service of the North American college fraternity movement.  He served his own fraternity, Phi Kappa Tau in a number of positions culminating with his appointment as executive director.  In 1970, Anson became executive director of the North American Interfraternity Conference, a position he held until his retirement in 1982.  His most significant achievement was his leadership in the effort to gain an exemption from Title IX to retain the single-sex character of American college fraternities and sororities.  When Title IX was first passed, it looked as though student organizations such as fraternities and sororities would have to become co-educational.  With the help of Senator Birch Bayh, a fraternity man and other friendly members of Congress, an exemption was gained that has not been in significant jeopardy of repeal since that time.

He was the author of The Golden Jubilee History of Phi Kappa Tau in 1957, A Diamond Jubilee History of the National Interfraternity Conference: 75 Glorious Years in 1984 and at the time of his death he was serving as editor of the current edition of Baird's Manual of American College Fraternities.

Legacy and honors
In 1985, Anson won the Interfraternity world's highest honor, the Gold Medal of the North American Interfraternity Conference.  In addition, he was widely honored by men's and women's Greek-letter organizations for his contributions to the North American college fraternity movement including awards from Lambda Chi Alpha, Delta Gamma and others.

In Anson's memory, the Association of Fraternity Advisors presents a Jack L. Anson Award and the National Interfraternal Foundation presents Jack L. Anson Fellowships.

1924 births
1990 deaths
Colgate University alumni
North American Interfraternity Conference
United States Army personnel of World War II
Phi Kappa Tau
People from Huntington, Indiana
United States Army non-commissioned officers